Phanerochaete avellanea is a species of fungus in the family Phanerochaetaceae. It is a plant pathogen that infects Platanus trees.

References

Fungal tree pathogens and diseases
avellanea
Fungi described in 1911